Outback ER is an Australian factual television show that looks at the work of the Emergency Department at Broken Hill Base Hospital in Broken Hill, New South Wales. This observational documentary series began on the ABC on 12 February 2015.

See also

Kings Cross ER
RPA
Medical Emergency

References

External links
Official web site Outback ER
Broken Hill Base Hospital Broken Hill Base Hospital | Service NSW

Australian Broadcasting Corporation original programming
Australian factual television series
2015 Australian television series debuts
English-language television shows
Television shows set in New South Wales
Australian medical television series
Television series by Screentime
Television shows set in the Outback